Lesticus deuvei is a species of ground beetle in the subfamily Pterostichinae. It was described by Dubault & Roux in 2006.

References

Lesticus
Beetles described in 2006